Brachyleptura is a genus of beetles in the family Cerambycidae, containing the following eight species:

Brachyleptura champlaini Casey, 1913
Brachyleptura circumdata (Olivier, 1795)
Brachyleptura dehiscens (LeConte, 1859)
Brachyleptura fulva
Brachyleptura pernigra (Linell, 1897)
Brachyleptura rubrica (Say, 1824)
Brachyleptura vagans (Olivier, 1795)
Brachyleptura vexatrix (Mannerheim, 1853)

References

Lepturinae